F-4 Phantom II non-U.S. operators are the non-U.S. nations with air forces that operate or used to operate the McDonnell Douglas F-4 Phantom II. The Phantom II entered service with the U.S. military in 1960 and served until 1996. During this time it was the primary interceptor, air superiority fighter and fighter bomber with the U.S. Navy, Marines and Air Force.

The Phantom II was exported to 11 other nations, and continues to serve in a military role in some parts of the world.

Australia

In March 1963, McDonnell Douglas offered to provide the RAAF with a modified version of the F-4C, the model 98DX, fitted with SNECMA Atar 9 engines. This engine was already used in the RAAF's Mirage IIIOs, but the French turbojet was inferior to the General Electric J79, and the RAAF chose instead to order the F-111C Aardvark which had a greater range.

Since the development of the F-111 was plagued with many setbacks, it was expected that the order for the RAAF would not be ready before 1974, leaving the Australian air force short of a suitable aircraft. The need to replace their Canberra B.20s was frustrated by the delay in the development of the F-111.

The solution was to loan F-4Es to the RAAF, under the Peace Reef program. On 22 June 1970, the contract was signed, and the first of 24 new F-4Es arrived the following September. They served with Nos. 1 and 6 Squadrons, both based at RAAF Base Amberley. The Australian aircrews praised the choice and the F-4Es were so well received that their popularity threatened the F-111C order at one point.

The first six aircraft were returned in October 1972, with another five returned in November 1972. The first six F-111Cs were delivered in June 1973, and the rest of the F-4Es were returned to the United States Air Force.

In 1972 the United States offered to sell the leased aircraft to Australia. Earlier, the Americans had offered to sell 48 aircraft, including RF-4Es if the RAAF had cancelled the F-111C. On balance, the F-4 would need to be supported by eight Boeing KC-135 Stratotankers to achieve the endurance required in Australian service with in-flight refueling, making the whole package uneconomical compared to the F-111C with its greater range. Also, acquisition of the Phantom would have required disbanding at least one Mirage squadron in order to provide the necessary aircrew (No. 82 Wing's aircrew were to be converted to the F-111). The F-111C program was resumed in December 1971.

One Phantom (69-7203) was lost in an accident during Australian service, off Evans Head, New South Wales during night bombing practice on 16 June 1971, while the others went on to follow a long career with the United States Air Force, with 21 examples later modified to F-4G Wild Weasel specifications and used by the 35th and 52nd TFWs.

Units
Royal Australian Air Force
No. 1 Squadron RAAF
No. 6 Squadron RAAF

Egypt

The Al Quwwat al Jawwiya il Misriya (Egyptian Air Force or EAF) encountered Israeli F-4s during fighting between the two states, especially during the later stages of the War of Attrition and the 1973 Yom Kippur War. These encounters gave the EAF a measure of the type's effectiveness, especially as a bomber.

After the Camp David Accords, and the Egypt–Israel peace treaty signed on 26 March 1979, Egypt ended its military dependence on the Soviet Union. It also lost the financial support of the other Arab states, and Saudi Arabia cancelled its plans to send Egypt 50 F-5s. The U.S. State Department proposed trading Egypt new military hardware in exchange for military aircraft made in the USSR, including MiG-21s, and the newer MiG-23s delivered to them by the Soviets prior to their breakdown of relations in 1976.

Under the September 1977 Peace Pharaoh agreement, 35 ex-31 TFW F-4Es along with a number of Sparrow, Sidewinder and Maverick missiles were supplied to the EAF for US$594 million and served with 76 and 78 Squadrons of the 222 Fighter Regiment. Initially, Egyptian ground crews found their maintenance far more complex than required for Soviet aircraft and consequently there was an average of only nine F-4s serviceable during 1982, a 26% serviceability rate. To correct the situation, Egypt considered selling some of the F-4s to Turkey and buying extra General Dynamics F-16 Fighting Falcons. However, assistance from U.S. advisors in 1985 made it possible to reach a reasonable serviceability rate, and in 1988 another seven F-4s were delivered. While further purchases of F-4s and upgrades were considered, these plans were rejected in favour of additional orders for F-16s.

By the end of the 1990s, three aircraft had crashed but were replaced with three others. As of 2018 the two squadrons of F-4s are retired and are in storage/reserve.

Units
Egyptian Air Force
222nd TFB (Wing) (Cairo West Air Base)
76th Squadron
78th Squadron

Germany

The German Air Force (Luftwaffe) operated a total of 175 F-4Fs, 10 F-4Es (for training at U.S. airfields) and 88 RF-4Es making it the largest Phantom export customer.

In 1971 the new West German Luftwaffe was only 16 years old, having been formed in 1955. In this short time, the air force had already passed through two generations of jet combat aircraft, having bought the North American F-86 Sabre and the Lockheed F-104 Starfighter.

By the early 1970s, the Luftwaffe had a formidable fighter strength, consisting of two interceptor, two reconnaissance and five bomber wings with F-104Gs, plus four light attack wings with Aeritalia G.91Rs.

RF-4E
The first F-4 model to enter German service was the RF-4E. The Luftwaffe signed a contract with McDonnell Douglas for 88 RF-4Es in 1968; at the time the biggest order outside the USAF. The contract included industrial offsets for German industry, particularly production work for Messerschmitt-Bölkow-Blohm who manufactured and supplied F-4 components to McDonnell Douglas' Phantom production facility in St. Louis.

On 16 January 1971 the first RF-4E, dubbed the "Spirit of St. Louis", flew from the U.S. to Spain and finally onto Germany. The next day, at Bremgarten, the aircraft was accepted by the Inspekteur der Luftwaffe ("Inspector of the Luftwaffe", Gunther Rall.

In 1972, with eight Phantoms per month being delivered, Aufklärungsgeschwader 51 "Immelmann" equipped with the RF-4, followed by AG 52, based at Leck.

The German RF-4E was equipped similarly to the USAF RF-4Cs, using the latest F-4E airframe and more-powerful engines. The RF-4Es were employed as day/night reconnaissance aircraft, equipped with four cameras covering 180 degrees. There were special flares for night use and two night/all-weather reconnaissance systems. One was the IRRS (Infrared Recognition System) and the other was the SLAR (Side-Looking Airborne Radar), mounted in the side of the fuselage. The aircraft had the capability to develop photos in flight and then drop them using special cartridges. Missions were generally flown at low level and high speed, using the installed APQ-99 radar for navigation. Deliveries were completed in May 1972 and the previously employed RF-104Gs were modified to serve in strike or fighter units.

F-4F
The Luftwaffe also intended to equip two fighter and two bomber Geschwader ("wings") with a simplified single-seat version of the F-4E Phantom which had already been proposed for the TFX USAF program. This was reconsidered due to the cost of that version and instead, under the Peace Rhine program, the Luftwaffe purchased the F-4F, which was based on the F-4E.

The F-4F had one of the seven fuselage fuel tanks omitted along with the capability to carry AIM-7 Sparrow missiles and bombs. It was equipped with air combat maneuvering leading edge slats and had a higher thrust to weight ratio, approaching 1:1 when fuel was low. The first example, serial number 3701, first flew on 18 March 1973. The first eight were sent to George AFB where crew training was carried out. In 1976, these trainers were replaced with 10 F-4Es, which stayed in the U.S. One of the "F"s, serial number 72-118, remained at Eglin AFB as an experimental project aircraft.
Units equipped with F-4F included Jagdgeschwader 71 "Richthofen", Wittmund, commencing in May 1974, and Jagdgeschwader 74 "Mölders", Neuburg an der Donau, September 1975. In April 1975, deliveries started to JaboG 36, Rheine-Hopsten and finally JaboG 35, Pferdsfeld. Operationally, the F-4Fs used by JG 71 and JG 74 were employed in the air-to-air role, while those used by JaboG 35 and 36 were used in air-to-air and air-to-ground roles.

Weapons used on the F-4F included the Mk 82 retarded bomb, BL755 cluster bomb unit and AIM-9 Sidewinders. Later on, an AGM-65 Maverick capability was added, with a pair of missiles housed in a single launcher.

Aircrew training
Luftwaffe aircrew training was conducted by the USAF at Sheppard AFB. The program included 13 months flying the T-37 and T-38, for a total of 200 hours for pilots and 85 hours for navigators.

Training in Europe was limited to a minimum of 500 ft (150 m) altitude, with special ranges permitting flight as low as 200 ft (60 m). Advanced training was conducted in Canada at CFB Goose Bay and at Decimomannu in Sardinia.

Losses
By 1990, Phantom losses were 21 F-4Fs and 15 RF-4Es.

RF-4E upgrades and disposal
Reconnaissance Phantom updates were carried out during several separate programs. Under the Peace Trout program, one RF-4E upgrade had an ELINT system installed in the nose, based on the APR-39 of the F-4G. Another RF-4E update was the installation of provision for bombs with up to six BL-755, or 5,000 lb (2,268 kg) of other external stores, and an ALE-40 chaff launcher along with a bombing system and newer cameras. In 1988, the aircraft were stood down from this dual role due to cost and this capability was removed.

After the reduction of conventional forces in Europe, the Luftwaffe began phasing out the RF-4Es in 1993–94. The surplus aircraft were supplied to Allied NATO nations, with 32 sent to Turkey and 20 to Greece. AG 51 received Panavia Tornados as a replacement, while AG 52 was disbanded.

F-4F upgrades and disposal

A total of 12 F-4Fs were initially modified for dual controls and were later de-modified. In 1980–83, the F-4F fleet was fitted with air-refueling probes, utilizing USAF tankers to make longer flights to Canada and Spain. The AIM-9B and F were replaced with the "L" version Sidewinder.

The "ICE" (Improved Combat Efficiency) program commenced in 1983 to upgrade the F-4F's air-to-air capabilities. This involved the APG-65 radar and AIM-120 AMRAAM as the main elements, along with many minor upgrades. The original plan was to upgrade 75 F-4Fs, but the number was increased to 110 in the late 1980s. Initially, the ICE upgrades were intended only for the interceptor wings, but more were upgraded due to delays in the Eurofighter Typhoon program.

Phase 1 of ICE commenced in 1989–90 and included upgrades such as the ALR-68 Radar warning receiver, the Honeywell H-423 laser gyro inertial navigation system, the GEC Avionics CPU-143/A digital central air data computer, and the Mil Std 1553R digital data bus.

In July 1989, the first F-4F ICE Phase 2 aircraft was completed, and on 22 November 1991 the first firing of an AIM-120 AMRAAM took place. In 1992, the first batch of six upgraded aircraft was delivered to JG 71 (Fighter Wing 71), but the AIM-120 AMRAAM missiles were not available at that time.

The F-4Fs were employed to fill operational gaps twice; the first time due to Panavia Tornado delays, while the F-4F ICE was needed due to the Eurofighter Typhoon delays. The units equipped with F-4F ICE were JG 71, JG 72, JG 74 and JG 73. This latter was a mixed unit, sent to Preschen airbase and had one staffel of F-4s and one with MiG-29s. This was a unique situation, until the phasing out of the Fulcrums.

The F-4F ICE program offered a reasonably inexpensive and capable aircraft for the interceptor role, albeit with limitations. Apart from natural deficiencies of the air frame design itself, the greatest drawbacks of the F-4F ICE were the lack of an IFF and MIDS capability. In beyond-visual-range scenarios, it therefore had to rely on target-identification by AWACS aircraft with which it had to communicate in a conventional voice-based manner. This together with the low number of procured AIM-120Bs (only 96, because Germany had ordered the MBDA Meteor, which however was not available until 2013) and the outdated APG-65 radar made it a rather defensive system.

In 1992–94 the EFA program was reviewed by German Defence Minister Volker Rühe and there was extensive debate about the Luftwaffe' s future. At the end of 1994, there were about 70 F-4F ICE aircraft already modified, 40 were still waiting for APG-65 radar, and 40 were not modified but still in service. The costs sustained in the upgrades had incurred a delay in AMRAAM acquisition. At that time, it was hoped that the AIM-120 could be received by 2005 and then there were only funds for 96 missiles with an option for 288 more. The program review considered ending F-4F conversions and buying new fighters as "gap fillers", such as the MiG-29, McDonnell Douglas F-15 Eagle or F-16. There was doubt that even a simplified version of the Typhoon could be acquired. The review resulted in F-4F ICE being completed. The lack of AMRAAMs was a serious handicap and the MiG 29s were retained for longer than had been planned.

The ICE F-4Fs were expected to remain in service until JG 71 transitioned to the Eurofighter Typhoon in 2013. JG 73 retired its last F-4F in 2002 and replaced it with Eurofighters in 2003, while the last F-4F left JG-74 in March 2008. The remaining F-4F wings were disbanded without replacement during the 1990s and early 2000s.  The German Air Force retired its last operational F-4F Phantom IIs on 29 June 2013. The Phantoms' retirement was attended by a crowd of 130,000 people at an open day at Wittmundhafen Air Base.  German F-4F Phantoms flew 279,000 hours from entering service on 31 August 1973 to retirement on 29 June 2013.

Units
German Air Force
Jagdbombergeschwader 35 (JaboG 35)
Jagdbombergeschwader 36 (JaboG 36)
Aufklärungsgeschwader 51 (AG 51 "Immelmann")
Aufklärungsgeschwader 52 (AG 52)
Jagdgeschwader 71 (JG 71 "Richthofen")
Jagdgeschwader 72 (JG 72 "Westfalen")
Jagdgeschwader 73 (JG 73 "Steinhoff")
Jagdgeschwader 74 (JG 74 "Mölders")
Wehrtechnische Dienstelle 61

Greece
At the end of the 1960s, the Hellenic Air Force (PA - Polemikí Aeroporía) embarked upon a modernization program by ordering 40 Dassault Mirage F.1s and a total of 56 F-4Es along with six RF-4Es. The final batch of 40 F-4Es were cancelled when a PASOK government was elected in 1981.

The first 18 Greek Phantoms entered in service in 1974, partially funded by U.S. military assistance under "Operation Icarus". However, they did not enter service in time to fight in the Turkish invasion of Cyprus in 1974. A second batch of F-4Es plus two extra aircraft were delivered in 1976, followed by a final batch in 1978–79. The first units equipped were the 339th Squadron in 1974 in the air-to-air role and also as the operational training unit; and the 338th Squadron, in 1975 in the ground-attack role. The 337th "Ghost" Squadron was equipped in 1978, giving up their Northrop F-5As. The 348th "Eyes" Squadron relinquished their RF-84Fs for new RF-4Es in 1979. The old RF-84Fs were retained until 1990 for training purposes.

The last batch of 40 Phantoms was not delivered due to the political situation in Greece, but with the Iraqi invasion of Kuwait and the US-led Operation Desert Storm liberation, the situation changed. The USAF phased out many older aircraft and some were supplied to the PA as a thank-you for the use of Greek airbases during the war. These included 10 ex-Indiana Air National Guard aircraft, later followed by another 18. By 1992, there were four squadrons equipped with 73 F-4Es and 5 RF-4Es: the 348th and 337th squadrons in Larissa with the 110th Combat Wing, and 338th and 339th squadrons at Andravida with the 117th Combat Wing.

There were many differences between the batches supplied to the Hellenic Air Force. The 338th "Ares" Squadron had an air-to-surface role. Their F-4Es were equipped with digital processors for the APG-120, laser inertial navigation systems, digital data buses, smoke-reduction systems and various structural improvements.

The 339th "Ajax" Squadron was employed in the air defense role with the older Phantoms, which had a Radar Warning Receiver mounted on the tail and air intakes, and the TISEO optical device.

Upgrades and further developments
One of the first measures taken by the PA was to increase the number of reconnaissance RF-4Es in their fleet, to augment the existing six. They were able to do this in 1993 when the Luftwaffe phased out their RF-4Es, and 29 ex-Luftwaffe aircraft were added to the 348th Mira. This last batch brought the number of F-4s serving with the PA to 121. Other programs saw the upgrade of several Greek Phantoms to carry out anti-radar operations.

In 1993 the PA called for a major electronic upgrade for the F-4 fleet, involving the replacement of the APQ-120 with a new AMRAAM-capable system. Contenders to conduct the upgrade were DASA, Rockwell International, and IAI. IAI was ruled out because it was already involved with the Greek's historical adversary, Turkey, upgrading their own Phantoms at this time.

DASA won the contract in August 1997, dubbed "Peace Icarus 2000". The Greek F-4s were upgraded to a similar standard as the Luftwaffe F-4F ICE, including APG-65 radar, a GEC-Marconi HUD and GPS/INS. The first flight of an upgraded aircraft was on 28 April 1999 at Manching airbase. In total 38 aircraft were upgraded, 37 of them by Hellenic Aerospace Industry, at Tanagra. Phantoms were also provided with Rafael LITENING pods, capable of navigation, targeting and use of guided weapons, such as the AGM-65 Maverick. With these improvements, the F-4 ICE and F-4G "Wild Weasel" will remain an effective fighter well into the 21st century.

The RF-4E reconnaissance versions were retired on 5 May 2017 and 348 Squadron was deactivated.

Units
Hellenic Air Force
110th Combat Wing
348th Tactical Reconnaissance Squadron "Eyes" Deactivated 5 May 2017.
117th Combat Wing
338th Fighter-Bomber Squadron "Aris/Mars"
339th Fighter Squadron "Ajax"

Iran

Approximately 225 F-4Ds, F-4Es and RF-4Es were delivered to Iran during the 1960s and 70s.

The Nirouye Havai Shahanshahiye Iran (Imperial Iranian Air Force) enjoyed more attention from Shah Mohammad Reza Pahlavi than any other military branch. By 1967 the air force had F-4Ds on order, at that time the most advanced Phantom model available. The original order was for 16 aircraft; the first of which arrived on 8 September 1968, with another 16 added later, and were employed in several unsuccessful attempts to intercept Soviet MiG-25Rs. These aircraft were also used for ground attack, and during one such mission, rebels in Oman shot one down.

In 1970, the first reconnaissance RF-4Es were delivered. Iran, with few fiscal restraints, followed that up with an order for 177 F-4Es. The first of these arrived in March 1971. During a border clash in June 1975, these F-4s, armed with AGM-65 Maverick missiles defeated an Iraqi armored ground formation. The F-4Es changed the balance of power in the region; they were not only effective on the battlefield, but available in large numbers as well.

After the fall of the Shah in the Iranian Revolution of 1979, the situation changed dramatically. In 1979 the U.S. placed an armament embargo on Iran, preventing it from getting many spare parts to keep the fleet flying. To make matters worse, the new theocratic government carried out purges of suspected Shah loyalists in the armed forces, especially in the renamed Islamic Republic of Iran Air Force (IRIAF). The purges greatly weakened the air force and left the 180 Phantoms still in service, largely without trained air and ground crews.

The Iran–Iraq War began in September 1980 with Saddam Hussein's attack on Iran. Hussein had equipped his air force with new aircraft, such as the MiG-23 and believed that Iran was in a weakened and vulnerable state following the revolution and subsequent purges. The Iranian forces surprised him and fought back effectively. Iraq failed to destroy the Iranian air force bases for several reasons, among them that Iraqi aircraft lacked the range to reach them. Another reason was that Iranian air bases had been built for USAF deployment in case of war with the Soviet Union. This meant that the bases were very large, well-dispersed and stocked with ample spare parts. This made the targets difficult for the small Iraqi air force to destroy.

The Iraqi air force performed a very deep strike of more than 837 km (520 mi) inside Iran, but this small formation was intercepted by two Iranian F-4s and one or two MiGs were lost. F-4s struck back the following day in Operation Kaman 99 and destroyed many strategic Iraqi targets with bombs and missiles. After these attacks against strategic targets, the F-4s struck tactical battlefield targets, destroying many Iraqi armored vehicles. The Iraqi invasion was stopped within several weeks.

Due to battlefield and accidental losses and the lack of spare parts, by the mid-1980s there were just 20–30 Iranian Phantoms still flying. The quantity of weapons and spare parts was not enough to sustain the fleet, but Iran is believed to have benefited from foreign assistance with clandestine shipments of up to 23 new airframes, plus spares from the U.S. and Israel (during the Iran-Contra Affair), as well as from locally designed and reverse-engineered components and weapons, and incorporation of ex-Soviet and Chinese technology. The aircraft of an Iranian F-4 pilot who deserted on 31 August 1984 to Saudi Arabia was examined and found to have Israeli and European spare parts installed. Another deserting F-4 was less lucky, being intercepted and shot down by Saudi F-15 Eagles on 5 June 1984. F-4s took part in interdiction missions against oil tankers using AGM-65 Maverick missiles and even AIM-9 Sidewinder air-to-air missiles, while bombs were not used, probably due to shortages.

In the 21st century, the Iranian government still has between 50 and 75 F-4s in service. Among these, there are still some original F-4Ds updated with improved avionics, including limited look-down radar. On 30 November 2014, Al Jazeera reported that an Iranian F-4 had conducted an airstrike in Iraq against Islamic State militants.  The United States confirmed the attack several days later, but Iran did not confirm or deny Iranian airstrikes had taken place; both denied they coordinated any sort of air attack against IS forces in Iraq.

Units
Imperial Iranian Air Force

Western Area Command:
Nojeh (OIHH) Hamadan, Shahrokhi)
3rd Tactical Air Base
31st Tactical Reconnaissance Squadron: RF-4E
32nd Tactical Fighter Squadron: F-4D and F-4E
33rd Tactical Fighter Squadron: F-4D and F-4E

Southern Area Command:
Bushehr (OIBB)
6th Tactical Air Base
61st Tactical Fighter Squadron: F-4E
62nd Tactical Fighter Squadron: F-4D and F-4E
Bandar Abbas Int'l (OIKB)
9th Tactical Air Base
91st Tactical Fighter Squadron: F-4E
92nd Tactical Fighter Squadron: F-4E
Chah Bahar (OIZC) (Chabahar)
10th Tactical Air Base
101st Tactical Fighter Squadron: F-4D

Israel

Israel first expressed interest in the F-4 in 1965, but the U.S. was unwilling to provide them at that time. However, due to the embargo imposed by France after the Israeli preemptive strike during the 1967 Six-Day War, the U.S. government reconsidered and decided to offer the Israelis the aircraft.

The first aircraft delivered were F-4Es, provided under the "Peace Echo" program, authorized on 7 January 1968, by president Lyndon Johnson, and supported by Senator Robert F. Kennedy. About 220 F-4Es and RF-4Es were delivered to Israel between 1969 and 1976 under U.S. aid programs, and served with the Tsvah Haganah le Israel/Heyl Ha'Avir (Israeli Air Force). The F-4E was known as Kurnass (Heavy Hammer) in Israeli service while the RF-4E was called Orev (Raven).

Formal acceptance of the first F-4Es came on 5 September 1969, with Golda Meir and Moshe Dayan present for the ceremony. By 22 October, the new aircraft were in operation, attacking Egyptian targets. On 11 November 1969 an F-4E first shot down a MiG-21. Shortly after on 9 December 1969, the first Israeli F-4 was downed by an Egyptian pilot, 1st Lts Ahmad Atef, flying a Mig-21 F-13. Egyptian fighters had a hard time dealing with the F-4s, and their SA-2 Surface-to-air missiles (SAMs) were not effective at low altitudes. To address the problem, SA-3s were shipped to Egypt, along with up to 5,000 Soviet advisers. In a fierce aerial battle on 30 July 1970, four Phantoms baited the Egyptian MiGs which this time were Soviet-manned. Up to five MiGs were shot down when eight Israeli Mirages, flying at low level, jumped them, achieving complete surprise. Late June and early July 1970 was a difficult time for the new F-4s, with two shot down by SAMs on 30 June, another on 5 July and two on 18 July.

A total of 24 Phantoms were delivered under Peace Echo II and III. Operation Night Light involved the loan of two RF-4Cs to the IDF while they were waiting for their order for six RF-4Es to be delivered. Operation Peace Patch involved another batch of 12 Phantoms, delivered in 1971.

Israeli F-4Es scored 116.5 aerial victories against Arab aircraft, including two Su-7s shot down on 9 September 1972 and a Libyan Boeing 727 in January 1973.

Peace Echo IV brought another 52 F-4s to the IDF, 24 of which were ex-USAF. These were delivered between April 1972 and October 1973, when the Yom Kippur War broke out. At that time there were 122 F-4E and 6 RF-4Es in service with the IDF.

Israeli Phantoms scored 11 air victories during this period although several were lost, mainly to SAMs, but above all they inflicted heavy damage on Egyptian land forces during the War of Attrition.

Yom Kippur War
The Yom Kippur War started with Egyptian and Syrian air strikes on Israel. During this opening phase a pair of Phantoms managed to shoot down seven Egyptian aircraft, and others shot down five Mil Mi-8s carrying assault troops over the Sinai desert.

On the second day of the war, the IDF launched attacks with F-4s and A-4 Skyhawks but the enemy air defence and MiGs shot down six Phantoms and 30 A-4s. The new SA-6 Gainful surface-to-air missile (SAM) system and the radar-guided ZSU-23-4 Shilka self-propelled anti-aircraft guns (SPAAGs) were much more effective than the old SA-2 Guideline. The SA-6 uses semi-active radar homing and was paired with the 1S91 "Straight Flush" fire control and guidance radar, which operates in the G, H, I and J bands, making it very difficult to jam with the AN/ALQ-87 ECM pods that were supplied by the Americans prior to the conflict. Likewise, the AN/ALR-36 radar warning receivers that Israeli Phantoms were equipped with at the time proved unable to provide any warning to aircrews that their aircraft were being tracked by SA-6 battery crews using the Straight Flush radar.

Some aerial maneuvers were believed to fool the SA-6 systems and these were used while the IDF waited for better ECM weapons. Some of the maneuvers were quite effective, but the SA-6 threat was only reduced on 9 October 1973 when A-4s surprised many SA-6 batteries without their missiles ready to fire and destroyed them. That same day another F-4 strike hit the Damascus HQ of the Syrian Army.

By the middle of October, 37 Phantoms had been lost in combat and another six were damaged beyond repair. U.S. President Richard Nixon authorized the delivery of 36 ex-USAF F-4s under Operation Nickel Grass, from the USAF 4th and 401st Tactical Fighter Wings. These aircraft were flown directly to Israel, some by U.S. pilots. At least one F-4E flew in combat still bearing a U.S. tail code, while others stayed painted in USAF camouflage patterns. During the war Israeli Phantoms first used the new AGM-65 Maverick missile.

Israel employed three F-4E(S), which were equipped with a special high-altitude camera system (HIAC) for reconnaissance missions. These RF-4Es were special high-performance Phantoms, with the same cameras planned for the Mach 3.2 RF-4X that was cancelled in 1975. The camera performed well but mounting it in an external pod caused too much drag, so it was installed in the nose of three normal F-4Es instead.

During the Yom Kippur War it was reported that one Israeli F-4 Squadron was put on alert for a nuclear strike, but not confirmed. After several weeks of combat, losses included four F-4s delivered under the Nickel Grass program.

Post 1973 period
After the war Peace Echo V provided Israel with 24 new, 24 ex-USAF and 6 RF-4Es, completing the program in November 1976.

Given that almost all the Israeli F-4s had suffered battle damage, an update to increase their capabilities and standardize the various production blocks was commenced in 1974. The IDF Phantoms received Elbit Jason digital bombing computers, Litton LW-33 inertial navigation systems, new radar warning receivers, TISEO and combat slats.

IDF Phantoms took part in many other battles, among them Operation Mole Cricket 19 in June 1982, when Syrian SA-6 sites were destroyed by a coordinated attack made by IDF aircraft and unmanned aerial vehicles. By that time, new F-15 Eagles and F-16s were replacing the Phantom in front line service, so the F-4s scored only one aerial victory in that action.

Weapons
Among the weapons carried on IDF F-4s were the Gabriel, AGM-45, AGM-68, Shafir and Python missiles.

Upgrades
The planned program to replace the original J79 engines with the Pratt & Whitney PW1120 was cancelled, but the fleet was updated to Kurnass 2000 standards. This upgrade included installation of a wide-angle Kaiser HUD, a digital mission computer and some structural improvements. The main updates involved the APG-76 radar, Elbit ACE-3 mission computer, HOTAS, the addition of winglets for increased agility, ASX-1 TISEO and the ability to deploy Popeye missiles. The upgraded aircraft first flew on 15 July 1987 and was formally accepted on 11 August 1987. The Kurnass program was also used to upgrade Turkish Air Force Phantoms at the same time, realizing some economies of scale.

Israeli Phantoms have suffered at least 55 combat losses but accounted for 116.5 claimed air victories.

By the end of the 20th Century there were still 112 F-4s serving with the IDF, in three Squadrons: the 119, 142 and 201.

Units
Israeli Air Force
69 Squadron Ha'patishim (The Hammers) - טייסת הפטישים
105 Squadron Akrav (Scorpion) - טייסת העקרב
107 Squadron Zanav Katom (Knights of the Orange Tail) - אבירי הזנב הכתום
119 Squadron Atalef (Bat) - טייסת העטלף
201 Squadron Ahat (The One) - הטייסת האחת

Japan

Japan selected the F-4 Phantom II as its new fighter at the end of the 1960s. On 1 November 1968, this choice was made public and Japan became one of the few countries that license-produced this aircraft. The Nihon Koku Jietai (Japan Air Self-Defense Force, JASDF) received a total of 154 F-4EJ and RF-4Es. While the F-4EJs were built almost entirely by Mitsubishi Heavy Industries, the RF-4Es were bought directly from McDonnell-Douglas.

Due to Japanese military limitations prohibiting air-to-ground ordnance, the F-4EJs were delivered without the AN/AJB-7 bombing computer system and also did not have an air-refueling probe or receptacle. In service F-4EJs replaced the JASDF's fleet of Lockheed F-104J Starfighters.

McDonnell Douglas built the two prototype F-4EJs (17-8301 and 17-8302), which first flew on 14 January 1971. These prototypes were delivered to Gifu Air Base in March 1971. The next 11 aircraft were assembled in Japan and the first Japanese-built example flew on 12 May 1972. Mitsubishi built all the EJs over the next nine years and the production ended with 127th F-4EJ (17-8440), on 20 May 1981. This was the last F-4 built in the world.

Fourteen RF-4Es were delivered between November 1974 and June 1975. These were similar to the RF-4C, but, as for the F-4EJs, Japanese-built radar warning receivers and other equipment were substituted to replace equipment which was not released for export to Japan.

The F-4EJ entered service with the JASDF in August 1972 with a total of six Hikōtai ("Squadrons") operating the aircraft: the 301, 302, 303, 304, 305 and 306th. The RF-4E equipped the 501st, that had previously operated one of the less-well-known Sabre models, the RF-86F.

Japanese procurement involved small, multi-year orders, which made for slow production of small batches ordered every year. As of 2007, Japan has a fleet of 90 F-4s currently in service. Talks were underway to replace them with Eurofighter Typhoon aircraft, since the sale of the American F-22 Raptor was blocked by U.S. export restrictions. In June 2007, Lockheed Martin announced that the company has been awarded a contract to equip several F-15 Eagles with synthetic aperture radar pods. These F-15s will be used in a reconnaissance role, allowing the RF-4E and RF-4EJ to be retired; the F-4 having served from the 1970s into the 21st century.

On 9 March 2020, the RF-4 was retired after 45 years in JASDF service. A four-ship flight of RF-4Es and RF-4EJs from 501st Hikōtai performed a ceremonial flypast, which included aircraft serial 47-6901, the first RF-4E built for Japan and the first to be handed over. This left 301st Hikōtai flying F-4EJ Kai models as the last remaining squadron equipped with Phantoms in Japan.

301st Hikōtai continued to operate the F-4EJ until 14 December 2020 when the Phantom was withdrawn from front-line service, remaining in use with the Air Development and Test Wing at Gifu. The final JASDF Phantoms were retired on 17 March 2021.

Upgrades
To upgrade the Phantom fleet the JASDF planned the F-4EJ Kai (Japanese for "modified") program. This involved 110 aircraft, later reduced to 96, which were upgraded with APG-66 radar, ground attack capabilities and most importantly, ASM-1 or ASM-2 anti-ship missiles (two mounted under the wings). This boosted their capabilities in the anti-shipping role; filling in for the indigenous Mitsubishi F-1s which were too few in number and lacked range, and the P-3Cs which were too slow, even if well-armed with Harpoon missiles. The F-4EJ Kai upgrade added several other air-to-surface weapons to the F-4, including bombs and rockets.

Fifteen F-4EJs were also converted to RF-4EJ configuration, which, while mounting no internal cameras, carried podded reconnaissance equipment. Among the systems installed were TACER (electronic reconnaissance pod with datalink), TAC (pod with KS-135A and KS-95B cameras), D-500UR IR detection system, and the LOROP pod (with a KS-146B camera).

The F-4EJ Kai first flew on 17 July 1984, and first entered service on 24 November 1989 to the JASDF 306th Squadron. It was fitted the smaller and more lightweight AN/APG-66J pulse Doppler radar and a heads-up display resulting in a lookdown/shootdown capability. The central computer was updated, as well as the J/APR-6 homing and warning system, IFF system and the inertial navigation unit.

The first F-4EJ Kai aircraft were delivered to the 306th Hikōtai at Komatsu, but within a few years they were replaced by F-15Js. In April 1994, the F-4EJ strength was reduced to three squadrons: 8 (Misawa), 301 (Nyutabaru) and 302 (Naha, Okinawa). The 501st at that time operated the RF-4E. Over time the F-4s and F-1s are being replaced with the new Mitsubishi F-2, an enlarged development of the F-16 developed jointly with Lockheed Martin.

Units
Japan Air Self-Defense Force
Air Development and Test Wing (1971–2021)
8th Hikōtai (1997–2009)
301st Hikōtai (1973–2020)
302nd Hikōtai (1974–2019)
303rd Hikōtai (1976–1987)
304th Hikōtai (1977–1990)
305th Hikōtai (1978–1993)
306th Hikōtai (1981–1997)
501st Hikōtai (1974–2020)

South Korea

Republic of Korea Air Force, ROKAF was supplied with F-4s in the late 1960s, due to ongoing tension with North Korea.

Seoul ordered 18 ex-USAF F-4Ds, which were quickly delivered under the Peace Spectator program. They served with the 110th TFS, 11th Fighter Wing based at Daegu. In 1972 another 18 were delivered from the USAF 3rd TFW (Tactical Fighter Wing), in exchange for which South Korea delivered 36 Northrop F-5As to South Vietnam. Several more F-4s were delivered in the following years, with the last batch delivered in 1987–88. These were equipped with Pave Tack laser designators, an important feature that allowed the use of laser-guided bombs.

A total of 92 F-4Ds were delivered, making this air force the main export customer for the "D" model. The F-4Ds were joined by 37 new-build F-4Es, ordered in the 1970s. The last of these was the 5,068th F-4 built in St. Louis. Under Operation Peace Pheasant these were delivered to the RoKaF 152 and 153 TFS (Tactical Fighter Squadron), 17th TFW at Chongju. This was only the beginning of South Korean F-4 acquisitions, as more ex-USAF F-4Es were delivered in the next few years, giving a total of 103 F-4Es.

The South Koreans also received RF-4Cs. There were 12 ex-USAF 460 TRG (Tactical Reconnaissance Group, disbanded in 1990) that were sent to the South Korean 131st TRS (Tactical Reconnaissance Squadron), 39 TRG, at Suwon Air Base, along with another 11 sent later. ALQ-131 electronic countermeasures pods were also delivered.

Overall, South Korea was one of the main customers of the F-4, with 216 delivered, including 60 "D" models, 55 "E" models and 18 RF-4Cs in service in 2000.

Upgrades

The South Korean Air Force has been quite satisfied with the F-4 and has carried out upgrades to extend their lifespan. A proposal made by DASA was evaluated that would have included installation of the APG-66 radar and AMRAAM missiles. This was equivalent to the Japanese F-4EJ KAI or German F-4 ICE, but the costs were too high for South Korea. The Air Force had already been forced to cancel an order for F-18s, which had been the winner of their new fighter competition and instead bought F-16 Fighting Falcons.

Despite the financial constraints, several minor upgrades were made to allow South Korean F-4s to continue in their role against North Korea. Some F-4s were upgraded with the AN/AVQ-26 Pave Tack laser targeting pod. 30 F-4Es were equipped with the AGM-142 "Popeye" stand-off air-to-surface missile; a modern Israeli weapon also purchased by the USAF, Royal Australian Air Force and the Turkish Air Force.

Units
Republic of Korea Air Force
10th Tactical Fighter Wing
39th TRG
131st TRS
11th Tactical Fighter Wing
110th TFS
151st TFS
17th Tactical Fighter Wing
152nd TFS
153rd TFS

Spain

Through the Mutual Defense Aid Program (MDAP), Spain acquired 36 ex-USAF F-4Cs for the Ejército del Aire (Spanish Air Force). These were the only "C" models ever exported, even as second-hand examples.

Deliveries occurred between October 1971 and September 1972 under Peace Alfa. At the time of delivery these F-4Cs were already obsolete, but they replaced even older aircraft, F-104Gs and F-86Fs.

In Spanish Air Force use, the F-4Cs were designated "C.12" (C stood for "Caza" and 12 stood for "12th fighter type in service since the creation of the Ejército del Aire"). The F-4Cs were assigned to Escuadrones 121 and 122, Ala 12 (Wing). To support them a fleet of three KC-97Ls was acquired in 1972, equipping Escuadrón 123, being replaced by KC-130Hs (which equipped Escuadrón 301) from January 1976.  While the KC-97s were fitted with a flying boom refuelling system, the Hercules that replaced them were fitted with the probe and drogue system and so could not refuel the F-4s.

Further F-4 deliveries took place in October 1978, with the addition of four F-4Cs and four RF-4Cs. The RF-4Cs were given the Spanish designation CR.12.

During their service, seven F-4C were lost to accidents before being replaced by EF-18s in April 1989.

The RF-4Cs continued to serve in the reconnaissance role along with another eight ex-USAF RF-4C delivered in 1989 in the 123 Squadron, that operated from Torrejón airbase.

This batch of RF-4Cs was updated to the highest USAF standard prior to delivery and had a completely revised avionic suite, including new radios, RWR, VOR and ILS navigation equipment and KS-86 cameras. These aircraft also had J79-GE-15E "smokeless" engines.

In 1995 the older F-4s were retired and six more RF-4Cs were obtained. The new RF-4Cs had newer avionics, including Have Quick digital UHF/VHF radios, Itek AN/ARL-46 RWR, and Tracor AN/ALE-40 dispensers. The upgrades included provisions for up to four AIM-9L Sidewinder missiles, for self-defence and to provide a secondary capability as an interceptor. The existing fleet underwent a standardization program which among other changes included replacing the APQ-99 terrain-following radar by a Texas Instruments AN/APQ-172 radar, laser-ring gyro inertial navigation system and an Israeli Aircraft Industries in-flight refueling probe, while the original USAF-style refuelling receptacle was retained.

These improvements allowed the Spanish RF-4C fleet to serve into the 21st century, finally being retired in 2002.

Turkey

One of the most prominent Phantom users is the Turkish Air Force ("Türk Hava Kuvvetleri" or THK), which operates about 233 F-4s.

Under the Peace Diamond I program 40 F-4Es were ordered, with deliveries starting in June 1974, although completion of the order was delayed by an arms embargo following the Turkish invasion of Cyprus. These aircraft equipped 161 Filo (Squadron) at 6 Ana Jet Us (Jet-aircraft air Base, also called JAB). After re-equipping with F-16Cs these Phantoms were sent to 7 JAB for 171 and 172 Filo. Filo 173 at the same base was the Operational Conversion Unit.

Peace Diamond III was an additional phase of the plan to reinforce the THK, always striving to keep a balance with the Greek Hellenic Air Force, because even though both are NATO countries, Greece and Turkey are historical enemies and there have been air clashes over the Aegean Sea between them. Filo 111, 112, 113, all based on JAB 1, Eskişehir, were the new Phantom units. The 111th and 112th Filo received 32 F-4Es replacing their aging F-100s. The 113 Filo replaced their even older RF-84Fs with eight RF-4Es.

With this last batch of F-4s and plans to acquire F-16 Fighting Falcons, the THK was quickly being modernized. Before these aircraft arrived the THK had operated fighters such as the F-104 Starfighter, F-100 Super Sabre, F-84 Thunderflash and the F-86 Sabre, plus the economical F-5 Freedom Fighter. With 80 Phantoms on order, the strength of the THK was increased to new levels. Other fighters, seen as supplemental to the F-4E, were purchased as well. These included 40 Aeritalia F-104Ss, the improved Starfighter, with the same missiles and engines as used on the Phantoms. These equipped Filo 142 and 172. Compared to the F-4s they were considerably less expensive and were used as interceptors. The Turkish F-4 fleet was enhanced with 15 secondhand US aircraft delivered in 1981 to Filo 173 and finally, another 15 delivered in 1984 to replace fleet losses.

Peace Diamond IV was another program to reinforce the THK and was carried out between June and October 1987. Under this program 40 F-4Es were delivered to 131 and 132 Filo, 3 JAB, Konya. Before that, this wing was only a training unit equipped with the last Turkish F-100s. After the conversion it became an operational formation.

Turkey assisted in Desert Storm without entering the fighting directly, by opening their airbases to the Coalition air forces and hosted Belgian Mirages, German Alpha Jets and Italian F-104Gs. As a reward for their help another 40 former US Air Force Phantoms were delivered to 112 and 172 Filo, beginning on 25 March 1991. At that time, the USAF was phasing-out large quantities of older aircraft, reducing their strength by over 1,000 F-4C/D/Es. But even if old, these aircraft were desirable to countries like Turkey who already had F-4 fleets.

The U.S. did not have enough RF-4s to sell to meet international demands, so when the German Air Force phased out their remaining 88 RF-4Es during 1992–93, 32 were delivered to the THK in 1992–94. All of these went to 113 Filo, Eskişehir. Later, when 173 Filo passed their F-4Es to 172 Filo, they equipped with RF-4Es. By the end of that reorganization, Filo 171 became a ground attack unit, 172 interception and 173 reconnaissance. That delivery completed the THK F-4 fleet.

Operational use

Many of the Turkish Phantoms are used as ground attack aircraft, a role they performed well due to the systems installed. The first Phantoms delivered to the THK had Southeast Asia camouflage colors and TISEO equipment, consisting of a wing-mounted television camera with zoom capacity for spotting targets outside of normal visual range. The F-4s acquired from US Air Force stocks were former 110th and 141st Tactical Fighter Squadron aircraft (Missouri and New Jersey Air National Guard squadrons, respectively) and arrived painted in "Egyptian One" camouflage, an air-superiority paint scheme consisting of two different shades of blue, despite being best-suited for ground attack. The last batch delivered had AVQ-23A Pave Spike laser designation pod compatibility.

In September 2010, U.S. Army spokeswoman Lt. Col. Tamara Parker confirmed a combined Chinese-Turkish exercise that ran from 20 September through 4 October at the Konya air base in Turkey's central Anatolia region. According to Reuters, a portion of the exercise included mock aerial combat between Turkish F-4s and Russian-built Su-27s of the Chinese military. It was reported that the Turks defeated the Chinese aircraft in air combat exercises.

On 22 June 2012, the Turkish government announced that Syrian forces had shot down a Turkish RF-4E from 113 Filo with two crew members over the Mediterranean Sea off the coast of Hatay Province, which borders the Syrian Latakia Governorate.  The aircraft is reported to have been conducting a reconnaissance flight off the Syrian coast. The Turkish release suggested that the Turkish government did not immediately view the Syrian action as provocative, and it acknowledged that Syrian assets were assisting efforts to find the aircraft and crew.  The Syrian Armed Forces made a statement carried by the official Syrian Arab News Agency crediting its antiaircraft gunners with downing an unidentified aircraft flying at "very low altitude and at high speed" over Syria's territorial waters toward land less than a mile offshore, causing it to crash into the sea west of the village of Om al-Tuyour. Syrian Foreign Ministry spokesman Jihad Makdissi said "the downing was an accident, caused by the "automatic response" of an officer commanding an anti-aircraft gun. The man saw a jet coming at him at high speed and low altitude and opened fire, Makdissi said." The statement went on to claim that the aircraft was found to be a "Turkish military plane that entered Syrian airspace and was dealt with according to laws observed in such cases".  The downing occurred at a time of heightened tensions between the two countries due to Turkish support for Syrian rebels opposed to the Bashar al-Assad regime in Damascus. On 24 June, wreckage of the F-4 was located in Syrian waters, but the crew had not been found. On 24 February 2015, two RF-4Es crashed in the Malatya region in southeast Turkey, under unknown circumstances, killing all four crew members. On 5 March 2015, an F-4E-2020 crashed in central Anatolia killing both crew. Calls to scrap the F-4s and replace them with the fifth generation F-35s were renewed.

Upgrades
Turkey considered more sophisticated supersonic fighters like the F-15 Eagle or Panavia Tornado to be too expensive; instead, the THK decided to upgrade its Phantom fleet with improvements to avionics and structure, but not to the engines. In August 1995, after a hotly contested competition with DASA (F-4 ICE), IAI was awarded a USD600M contract to upgrade 54 F-4Es to Phantom 2000s. The first 26 aircraft were rebuilt in Israel, and the other 28 in Turkey.

Structure
Small strakes above the air intakes to improve agility, new attachment fittings, engine mountings, stronger wing fold ribs, updated canopy sill bar, 12 mi (20 km) of wiring replaced (reducing weight by 1,653 lb/750 kg) as well as most hydraulic and pneumatic lines and hoses, and fuel tank reinforcements.

Avionics
New multifunction display in the front cockpit plus two in the rear, new Kaiser El-OP 976 wide-angle HUD and HOTAS system, high-performance Elta EL/M-2032 ISAR-capable high-resolution SAR/GMTI (ground moving target indicator) multi-mode fire-control radar (developed for the IAI Lavi), IAIC mission computer, new navigation equipment including GPS/INS connected to mapping mode, dual MIL-STD-553B databus managing avionics package, Astronautics Central Air Data Computer, new UHF and IFF packages, airborne video tape recorder (AVTR), Elta EL/L-8222 active ECM pod and Mikes (Aselsan) AN/ALQ-178V3 passive embedded SPEWS, and RWR.

Additionally, they had AGM-142 Popeye/Have Nap integration, Litening-II targeting pods, and the capability to launch AGM-65D/G Maverick, AGM-88 HARM, GBU-8 HOBOS, GBU-10/12 Paveway II LGBs, general purpose and cluster bombs for air-to-ground missions, while retaining the capability to launch AIM-7 Sparrow and AIM-9 Sidewinder air-to-air missiles. It is also possible to install Pave Spike targeting pods and rocket pods of all sizes.

These upgraded F-4 Phantoms are referred to as the F-4E-2020 Terminator and current planning is that they will remain in service until 2020, as the name suggests. The first entered service on 27 January 2000 with deliveries to 111 and 171 Filo.

Units
Turkish Air Force

At the end of the 20th century, the following THK units operated Phantoms:

 Ana Jet Üs (Jet Air Base), Eskişehir: 111 Filo "Panter" (F-4E/2020), 112 Filo "Şeytan" (F-4E), 113 Filo "Işık" (RF-4E)
 Ana Jet Üs, Konya: 132 Filo "Hançer" (F-4E/2020)
 Ana Jet Üs, Erhaç-Malatya: 171 Filo "Korsan" (F-4E/2020), 172 Filo "Şahin" (F-4E), 173 Filo "Şafak" (F-4E)
1st Tactical Air Force
111 Filo112 Filo113 Filo2nd Tactical Air Force
132 Filo171 Filo172 Filo173 FiloUnited Kingdom

F-4K (Phantom FG.1)
Following cancellation of the supersonic V/STOL Hawker Siddeley P.1154, the Royal Navy selected the Phantom as a replacement for the Supermarine Scimitar and de Havilland Sea Vixen. The model requested was designated the F-4K by McDonnell Douglas and received the British service designation Phantom FG.1. Ordered in July 1964, this was the first time the U.S. permitted export of the Phantom, with the first F-4K flying on 27 June 1966.

To ease the impact on employment in the UK aircraft industry from the cancellation of home-grown programs, the aircraft had a high British content. The main modification was the replacement of the General Electric J79 by the British-made Rolls-Royce Spey powerplant. These engines (RB 168-25R Spey Mk 202/203s) were more powerful than the J79s ( afterburning thrust) and had a lower fuel consumption (power-specific fuel consumption was around ). The rear fuselage was heavily modified to accommodate the larger Speys and the air intakes enlarged to permit the greater airflow they required.  These aircraft were equipped with an AN/AWG-11 radar system, which was a version of the Westinghouse AN/AWG-10 built under licence by Ferranti,Donald 1999, p. 5. equipped with a Doppler unit to allow some basic look-down capabilities. The bombing system was the anglicized version of the Lear/Siegler AN/ABJ-7. Fleet Air Arm Phantoms were fitted with a double-telescoping front landing gear strut that could extend , the increased angle of attack being necessary for catapult launches from the smaller British carriers. Other British contractors, including Short Brothers and British Aircraft Corporation, built sub-assemblies and supplied parts to the United States where the aircraft were assembled by McDonnell Douglas at Saint Louis.

A Spey-powered Phantom was not a new concept: McDonnell Douglas had considered the idea to meet the USAF TFX requirement, later satisfied by the General Dynamics F-111. The Spey gave an increase of 10% in operational range, 15% increase in ferry range and better low-level acceleration, however the increased drag of the engine installation resulted in poorer performance at high altitude. Although some of the design changes were unique to the British aircraft – folding radar radome, Spey engine, nose-wheel extension and strengthened arrester hook – the other structural changes and improvements were used in the design of the F-4J. After modifications in the 1970s, the tail had a new RWR system; a British-made Marconi ARI.18228 fitted in a rectangular antenna box on the fin tip.

Initially, a total of 140 FG.1s were to be ordered for the Fleet Air Arm; the intention was to operate the Phantom from both of the Royal Navy's remaining large fleet carriers, Eagle and Ark Royal, and the brand new CVA-01 carriers. However, the 1966 Defence White Paper saw the cancellation of the CVA-01 project, with the Royal Navy's Phantom order cut to 48. This was intended to provide for two squadrons each of 12 aircraft to be operated from Eagle and Ark Royal, both of which were to be heavily modified. While Ark Royal was undergoing conversion, the FG.1 underwent successful deck trials aboard Eagle. In 1969, however, the decision was taken that Eagle would not undergo conversion, leaving Ark Royal as the only Royal Navy carrier capable of operating the Phantom. As a consequence, 20 of the Fleet Air Arm's FG.1s were diverted to the Royal Air Force to equip No. 43 Squadron at RAF Leuchars in the air-defence role. These aircraft were modified to enable them to carry the SUU-23/A gun pods. The units equipped were 700P Naval Air Squadron trials unit, 767 Naval Air Squadron training unit, and a single operational squadron, 892 Naval Air Squadron, all home based at Yeovilton. 892 NAS commissioned with the Phantom in 1969, and embarked in Ark Royal for the first time in 1970, making the Fleet Air Arm the only naval air arm outside the United States to operate the Phantom from the deck of an aircraft carrier.

Service with the Fleet Air Arm was brief, with 892 NAS operating from Ark Royal from 12 June 1970 to 27 November 1978. After that, the remaining FG.1s were transferred to the RAF to form No. 111 Squadron, a second air-defence squadron. The two RAF squadrons converted to the Tornado F.3 in 1989 when the FG.1s were withdrawn from service.

F-4M (Phantom FGR.2)

With the cancellation of home-grown programmes and the need to replace the Hawker Hunter and English Electric Canberra in the ground-attack and tactical reconnaissance roles, the RAF ordered 118 aircraft in 1965. The aircraft were designated Phantom FGR.2 ("Fighter/Ground attack/Reconnaissance") by the British and the prototype first flew on 17 February 1967. Like the Phantom FG.1 it was equipped with Spey engines and was externally identical, although it did not have the extendable nose-wheel. It was fitted with an AN/AWG-12 radar and fire-control system, similar to the AN/AWG-11 but without the ability to fold the radome and antenna back to enable the aircraft to fit the lifts on an aircraft carrier, and Martin-Baker Mk.H5 ejection seats. The aircraft entered service from 1969 onwards with Nos. 2, 6, 14, 17, 31, 41 and 54 Squadrons in the close air support, tactical strike and tactical reconnaissance roles. However, when the SEPECAT Jaguar entered service from 1974 onwards, the Phantom FGR.2s were redeployed in the air defence role, replacing English Electric Lightnings with Nos. 19, 23, 29, 56 and 92 Squadrons.

Some FGR.2s were equipped with dual controls, and others could carry a reconnaissance pod that was equipped with a Texas Instruments RS-700 infrared linescan unit, high-definition sideways-looking radar and five optical cameras. Although not deployed in a war role RAF Phantoms were involved in air-defence duties on Quick Reaction Alert. This involved endless alarms to intercept "Bear" and other Soviet aircraft approaching British airspace, the North Sea and over Germany. The fitting of RWRs and structural reinforcements were carried out to the aircraft in the 1970s.

In 1982, an AIM-9-armed Phantom FGR.2 returning from a Quick Reaction Alert over Germany accidentally shot down a Royal Air Force Jaguar GR.1.

In the strike role the FGR.2s could carry the SNEB rocket pod,  bomb, the BL755 Cluster Bomb Unit, and U.S.-supplied B28, B43, B57 or B61 nuclear weapons. It could also be fitted with SUU-16/A and SUU-23/A gun pods. From 1975 the aircraft were modified with structural reinforcements and tail-mounted radar warning receivers. When the aircraft took over the air-defence duties in the 1970s they carried either AIM-9G Sidewinders or AIM-7 Sparrows, and later they would carry the then new British Aerospace Skyflash missile and the updated AIM-9L Sidewinder. In the 1980s, the Tornado started to replace the Phantom in the air-defence role.

The Greek Air Force (Polemiki Aeroporia, PA) was interested in buying 32 aircraft in 1992 but the differences were too great between the FGR.2 and the F-4Es they operated.

F-4J(UK) (Phantom F.3)
The deployment of a squadron of Phantom FGR.2s to the Falkland Islands after the 1982 War left a gap in the RAF's air defences. With the Tornado ADV still some years from operational service, the RAF purchased 15 second-hand former U.S. Navy F-4J aircraft, chosen from among the best stored at Davis-Monthan Air Force Base and upgraded to a level almost equal to the F-4S. Although they were officially designated as the Phantom F.3, this was rarely used, instead being generally referred to as the F-4J(UK). The main difference was the absence of combat slats as requested by the RAF, since they were considered to be a "source of drag".

This also simplified the training of RAF crews as slats were not fitted to other RAF Phantoms. The aircraft were totally overhauled at Naval Air Station North Island and fitted with AWG-10B radar (having Skyflash missile guidance capability, with monopulse I band sensor), smokeless engines and provision for Skyflash missiles. The first F-4J(UK) was delivered to the RAF on 2 August 1984 and from there RAF crews delivered the aircraft to the UK after training.

They entered service with No. 74 Squadron (Tiger Squadron), based at RAF Wattisham in the air-defence role. Crews liked the aircraft, and generally rated them better than the Spey-equipped FGR.2s. The radar was also praised: "engines are good and the radar is excellent" in the words of a pilot. Despite their age and the lack of combat slats these aircraft served well until being phased out in January 1991 in favour of surplus Phantom FGR.2s, before the Phantom was finally retired in 1992.

After 25 years of service the Phantoms ended their RAF career: as a result of the Options for Change military budget reduction in 1990, it was decided to phase out the Phantom. These aircraft were designed for a lifetime of only 1,000 hours but were pushed to 5,800 hours, many of them flown at low-level. First units to disband were the RAF Wildenrath-based 19 and 92 Squadrons, which were the last air defence units to serve in RAF Germany, followed by 56 Squadron in May 1992. The last Phantom squadron, 74 Squadron was disbanded on 1 October 1992.

Units
Royal Navy Fleet Air Arm
700P Naval Air Squadron
767 Naval Air Squadron
892 Naval Air Squadron
Phantom Post-Operational Conversion Unit
Royal Air Force
No. 2 Squadron
No. 6 Squadron
No. 14 Squadron
No. 17 Squadron
No. 19 Squadron
No. 23 Squadron
No. 29 Squadron
No. 31 Squadron
No. 41 Squadron
No. 43 Squadron
No. 54 Squadron
No. 56 Squadron
No. 64 Squadron/No. 228 Operational Conversion Unit
No. 74 Squadron
No. 92 Squadron
No. 111 Squadron
No. 1435 Flight
Phantom Training Flight
Phantom Conversion Flight
Aeroplane and Armament Experimental Establishment

See also
 F-4 Phantom II
 F-4 Phantom II variants
 F-4 Phantom II U.S. operators

References

Notes

Citations

Bibliography

 Beit-Hallahmi, Benjamin. The Israeli Connection: Whom Israel Arms and Why. London: I.G Tauris, 1987. .
 Bishop, Farzad and Tom Cooper. Iranian F-4 Phantom II Units in Combat (Osprey Combat Aircraft #37). Oxford, UK: Osprey Publishing Limited, 2003. .
 Bonsignore, Ezio. Un caccia ad interim per la Germania? (in Italian) RID, Issue 10, 1994.
 Calvert, Denis. RAF Retires her Phantoms. (in Italian) Aerei Magazione, March 1993.
 Calvert, Denis. The RAF's Tigers. (in Italian) Aerei, Issue 5, 1991.
 Cruz, Gonzalo Avila. Iberian Phantoms. Air Enthusiast. Number 114, November/December 2004, pp. 28–41. Stamford Lincolnshire: Key Publishing. .
 Donald, David. RAF Phantoms. Wings of Fame. London: Aerospace. Volume 15, 1999, pp. 4–21. .
 Donald, David and Jon Lake. Encyclopedia of World Military Aircraft. London: Aerospace.  Single Volume Edition, 1996. .
 Foster, Peter. I Phantom della HHA. (in Italian) Aerei, Issue 9, 1998.
 Fricker, John. Boeing /McDonnell Douglas F-4 Phantom II Current Operators. World Air Power Journal, Volume 40, Spring 2000, pp. 56–89. .
 Green, William and Gordon Swanborough. The Great Book of Fighters. St. Paul, Minnesota: MBI Publishing, 2001. .
 Hobbs, David. British F-4 Phantoms. Air International, Vol. 74 No. 4, May 2008, pp. 30–37. . 
 Hobson, Chris. Vietnam Air Losses, USAF/Navy/Marine, Fixed Wing Aircraft Losses in Southeast 1961-1973. North Branch, Minnesota: Specialty Press, 2001. .
 Lake Jon. Phantom Spirit in the Skies. London: Aerospace Publishing, 1992. .
 Donald, David and Jon Lake, eds. McDonnell F-4 Phantom: Spirit in the Skies. London: AIRtime Publishing, 2002. .
 List, Friedrich. German Air Arms Review. Air International Volume 70, No. 5, May 2006, pp. 50–57. Stamford, Lincolnshire, UK: Key Publishing. .
 Mazzardi, Pietro and G. Maffioli. Il cavallino rampante della Westfalia (JG 72). (in Italian) Aerei, Issue 2, 1993.
 Mevlutoglu, Arda. Anatolian Phantoms. Air International, Vol. 80 No.1, January 2011, pp. 40–45. . 
 Niccoli, Riccardo and R. Sacchetti. Phantom II. (in Italian) Fantasmi Crociati, JP-4, Issue 2, 1991.
 Nordeen, Lon. Fighters Over Israel. London: Guild Publishing, 1991. .
 Rollino, Paolo. Phantoms in Tanagra. (in Italian) Aerei, Issue 10, 1992.
 Thetford, Owen. British Naval Aircraft since 1912. London: Putnam, Fourth Edition, 1994. .
 Thornborough, Anthony M. and Peter E. Davies. The Phantom Story. London: Arms and Armour Press, 1994. .
 Wilson, Stewart. Phantom, Hornet and Skyhawk in Australian Service''. Weston Creek, ACT, Australia: Aerospace Publications, 1993. .

External links
Phantom ICE in Germany
F-4EJ Kai in airwar.ru
Baughers Index of Phantom Operators and Variants

Operators2
F-4 Phantom II non-U.S. operators
Articles containing video clips